Cicatrix schauffi is a species of wasp found in Australia. It was initially described as Mikeius schauffi in 2008 by Matthew Buffington. In a 2011 revision, the species was moved from Mikeius to the newly erected genus Cicatrix.

References 

Cynipoidea
Insects described in 2008